Rahmatabad (also Romanized as Raḥmatābād; also known as Raḥmatābād-e Rīgān) is a village in Rigan Rural District, in the Central District of Rigan County, Kerman Province, Iran. At the 2006 census, its population was 3,615, in 737 families.

References 

Populated places in Rigan County